Esoptron is the second full-length album by Septic Flesh, released in 1995. The actual title is ΕΣΟΠΤΡΟΝ or Έσοπτρον, the word in Greek for "(inner) mirror". 
The album has been reissued in June 2013 by Season of Mist.

This album is widely considered to be Septic Flesh's most experimental and progressive release. Also, it is the only Septic Flesh album not to feature guitarist/composer Christos Antoniou, as he took a leave of absence from the band during this period. Though someone named "Kostas" is credited as a session drummer, all drums were programmed.

Track listing

Personnel 
 Septic Flesh – production
 Spiros A. – bass, vocals, artwork
 Sotiris V. – guitars, vocals, keyboards

 Additional musicians 
 Kostas – drums (session)

 Production 
 George "Magus Wampyr Daoloth" Zaharopoulos – production, engineering

References 

1995 albums
Septicflesh albums
Albums with cover art by Spiros Antoniou
Albums by Greek artists
Holy Records albums
Season of Mist albums